General Hoffman, Hoffmann, or Hofmann may refer to:

Carl W. Hoffman (1919–2016), U.S. Marine Corps major general
Donald J. Hoffman (born 1952), U.S. Air Force four-star general
Heinz Hoffmann (1910–1985), East German Land Forces general
Max Hoffmann (1869–1927), Imperial German Army major general
Robert A. Hoffmann (fl. 1960s–1990s), U.S. Air Force brigadier general 
Roy Hoffman (United States Army officer) (1869–1953), U.S. Army major general
Rudolf Hofmann (1895–1970), German Wehrmacht general

See also
Günther Hoffmann-Schönborn (1905–1970), German Wehrmacht major general
Attorney General Hoffman (disambiguation)